Taj Kuh (also Romanized as Tāj Kūh) is a village in Fasharud Rural District, in the Central District of Birjand County, South Khorasan Province, Iran. At the 2016 census, its population was 109, in 35 families.

References 

Populated places in Birjand County